Paweł Małaszyński (born June 26, 1973 in Szczecinek, Poland) is a Polish TV and film actor. He also leads a music band "Cochise".

Starred in 

Usta usta (2020) - Dominik, Magda's lover
Friends (2020) - Artur MorawskiWeekend (2010)Guardians of the Galaxy - Peter Quill / Star-Lord (Polish dubbing)Teraz albo nigdy! (2008) - Paweł MałaszyńskiLatający Cyprian (2008) - MartinTrzeci oficer (2008) - Jacek Wielgosz "Grand"Twarzą w twarz (2007) - Wiktor Waszak "Ważka"Katyń (2007) - Lieutenant Pilot Piotr BaszkowskiŚwiadek koronny (2007) - Marcin KrukTajemnica Twierdzy Szyfrów (2007) - Johann JorgOficerowie (2006) - Jacek Wielgosz "Grand"Stowarzyszenie (2005) - MareczekOficer (2004–2005) - Jacek Wielgosz "Grand"Magda M. (2005–2007) - Piotr KorzeckiBiała sukienka (2003) - Damian PrzeździeckiM jak miłość (2003) - Marcin Polański-Van Burgen (guest starring)Na dobre i na złe (2002) - Łukasz Sadowski (guest starring)Pianista (2002) - man in ghettoKameleon (2001) - one of junkiesWiedźmin'' (2001) - youngster in tavern

External links 
 

Polish male film actors
People from Szczecinek
1973 births
Living people
Polish male television actors